Ethnikos Assia Football Club is a Cypriot football team currently playing in the Cypriot Second Division. The team was established in Assia, Famagusta, but since the Turkish invasion of 1974, Ethnikos became a refugee team. The club is now based in the capital Nicosia and play their home games at the Makario. The club has played three times in the first division, the last time was during the 2001–02 season.

Achievements
Cypriot Third Division Winners: 1
 2011
Cypriot Cup for lower divisions Winners: 1
 2011

External links
 Website

Football clubs in Cyprus
Association football clubs established in 1966
1966 establishments in Cyprus